Kinnerasani is a 2022 Indian Telugu-language mystery thriller film written and directed by Ramana Teja. Produced by Ram Talluri, the film stars Kalyan Dhev and Ann Sheetal in the lead roles while Ravindra Vijay, Mahati Bikshu play the supporting roles with the music composed by Mahati Swara Sagar. The film was released on 10 June 2022 on ZEE5.

Plot

Cast 
 Kalyaan Dhev as Venkat
 Ann Sheetal as Vedha 
 Ravindra Vijay as Jayadev
 Shriya Tyagi as Parvathi
 Kashish Khan as Vedha 
 Mahati Bikshu
 Satya Prakash
 Bhanu Chander

Release 
The film was premiered on ZEE5 platform on 10 June 2022.

Reception 
Thadhagath Pathi of The Times Of India rated the film 2 out of 5 stars and wrote "Kinnerasani doesn’t have anything new to offer, barring a few twists and turns". Arvind V of Pinkvilla rate the film 2 out of 5 stars and wrote "The film is edgy in fits and starts in the first hour. The second half, on the other hand, descends into basicness and even succumbs to formula".

References

External links 

2022 films
Indian mystery thriller films
2022 thriller films
Films shot in Hyderabad, India
2020s Telugu-language films
ZEE5 original films
Indian direct-to-video films
2022 direct-to-video films
Films set in Andhra Pradesh
Films about murder
Films set in Hyderabad, India